Participation or Participant may refer to:

Politics 
Participation (decision making), mechanisms for people to participate in social decisions
Civic participation, engagement by the citizens in government
e-participation, citizen participation in e-government using information and communications technology

Finance 
Participation (ownership), an ownership interest in a mortgage or other loan
Participation, the amount of benefit in a bond plus option due to the performance of an underlying asset
Capital participation, ownership of shares in a company or project

Other uses 
Participation (philosophy), the inverse of inherence: if an attribute inheres in a subject, then the subject participates in the attribute
 Participant Media, an American film-production company founded in 2004